1868 Thersites  is a large Jupiter trojan from the Greek camp, approximately  in diameter. Discovered during the Palomar–Leiden survey at Palomar in 1960, it was later named after the warrior Thersites from Greek mythology. The presumed carbonaceous C-type asteroid belongs to the 50 largest Jupiter trojans and has a rotation period of 10.48 hours.

Discovery 

Thersites was discovered on 24 September 1960, by Dutch astronomer couple Ingrid and Cornelis van Houten at Leiden, on photographic plates taken by Tom Gehrels at the Palomar Observatory in California. On the same day, the group discovered another Jupiter trojan, 1869 Philoctetes.

The body's observation arc begins with a precovery taken at Palomar in March 1954, more than 6 years prior to its official discovery observation.

Palomar–Leiden survey 

The provisional survey designation "P-L" stands for Palomar–Leiden, named after the Palomar and Leiden observatories, which collaborated on the fruitful Palomar–Leiden survey in the 1960s and 1970s. Gehrels used Palomar's Samuel Oschin telescope, also known as the 48-inch Schmidt Telescope, and shipped the photographic plates to Cornelis and Ingrid van Houten at Leiden Observatory, where astrometry was carried out. The trio are credited with the discovery of several thousand minor planets.

Orbit and classification 

Thersites is a dark Jovian asteroid orbiting in the leading Greek camp at Jupiter's  Lagrangian point, 60° ahead of the Gas Giant's orbit in a 1:1 resonance (see Trojans in astronomy). It is also a non-family asteroid in the Jovian background population. It orbits the Sun at a distance of 4.7–5.9 AU once every 12 years and 3 months (4,478 days; semi-major axis of 5.32 AU). Its orbit has an eccentricity of 0.11 and an inclination of 17° with respect to the ecliptic.

Physical characteristics 

The Trojan asteroid has been assumed to be a carbonaceous C-type asteroid.

Rotation period 

In July 1994, a first rotational lightcurve of Thersites was obtained from photometric observations by Italian astronomer Stefano Mottola using the former Dutch 0.9-metre Telescope at ESO's La Silla Observatory in northern Chile. Lightcurve analysis gave a rotation period of  hours with a brightness variation of  magnitude. The best-rated lightcurve by Robert Stephens at the Center for Solar System Studies from June 2016 gave a period of 10.48 hours and an amplitude of 0.27 magnitude. Follow-up observation in 2017 gave a similar period of 10.412 hours.

Diameter and albedo 

According to the space-based surveys carried out by the Japanese Akari satellite and the NEOWISE mission of NASA's Wide-field Infrared Survey Explorer, Thersites has a low albedo of 0.055 and measures 78.9 and 68.2 kilometers in diameter, respectively. The Collaborative Asteroid Lightcurve Link assumes a standard albedo for a carbonaceous asteroid of 0.057, and calculates an intermediate diameter of 70.08 kilometers with an absolute magnitude of 9.5.

Naming 

This minor planet was named from Greek mythology after Thersites, a Greek warrior who wanted to abandon Troy's siege during the Trojan War and head home. The given name also refers to the fact, that the asteroid was discovered farthest from the  Lagrangian point. The official  was published by the Minor Planet Center on 1 June 1975.

Notes

References

External links 
 Asteroid Lightcurve Database (LCDB), query form (info )
 Dictionary of Minor Planet Names, Google books
 Discovery Circumstances: Numbered Minor Planets (1)-(5000) – Minor Planet Center
 
 

001868
Discoveries by Cornelis Johannes van Houten
Discoveries by Ingrid van Houten-Groeneveld
Discoveries by Tom Gehrels
2008
Named minor planets
19600924